Charles Burger Woodcock, created Freiherr Woodcock-Savage, later Charles Woodcock-Savage (1 May 1850 – 26 June 1923), was a New Yorker who achieved notoriety as the lover of King Karl I of Württemberg, by some decades his elder.

Charles Woodcock was born in New York City, the son of Jonas Gurnee Woodcock (1822–1908) and Sarah Savage Woodcock (1824–1893). He went abroad to study and found a place as chamberlain at the Royal Court of the Kingdom of Württemberg, where he became the favorite of the King, who had had several previous favourites. In 1888, Karl  elevated Charles Woodcock to the nobility as "Freiherr Woodcock-Savage", creating an uproar that sent Woodcock back to New York in 1890. In New York, he adopted the last name "Savage."

On 14 June 1894, Charles B. Woodcock-Savage married a widow, Henrietta Knebel Staples, with four sons. On 19 June 1897, all of her sons (Joseph, Harry, Herbert, and Leslie Curtis) legally changed their last names to Savage. Leslie Curtis also changed his first name to Charles.

In 1906, Charles, Freiherr Woodcock-Savage, published A Lady in Waiting: Being extracts from the diary of Julie de Chesnil, sometime lady-in-waiting to her Majesty, Queen Marie Antoinette (New York: D. Appleton and Company). He dedicated it "To a Noble Soul I Knew and Loved and Mourn." The King had died in 1891. The introduction gives a circumstantial account of the yellowed pages found locked in the secret drawer of a Louis Seize cabinet sold at the auction house of Hôtel Drouot and bought by the translator's dear friend from Paris days, an aesthete, who gives permission to publish. The memoirs offered in this frame story are in fact a novelistic pseudo-autobiography.

References

Further reading

Katz, Jonathan Ned. "Americans in Württemberg Scandal." www.OutHistory.org in four parts.
Smith, Geoffrey Dayton (1997) American Fiction, 1901–1925: A Bibliography (Cambridge University Press) no. W-847.
Hauptstaatsarchiv Stuttgart, E 75 (Württembergische Gesandtschaft in München)  Bü 6 (Presseerörterungen betr. den Freiherrn von Woodcock-Savage, 1888)
 Hauptstaatsarchiv Stuttgart, E 55
Roots: Charles Burger Woodcock

External links
 

1850 births
1923 deaths
People from New York City
Royal favourites
LGBT people from New York (state)
Burials at Trinity Church Cemetery